Tomáš Zápotočný (born 13 September 1980) is a retired Czech footballer, who lastly played for 1. FK Příbram in the Czech National Football League.

Football career
He signed for Udinese in the January transfer window for an unconfirmed €500,000 bid. He arrived from Czech side Slovan Liberec, for whom he was the captain and won the 2006–07 player of the season award. He scored his first goal for the club in a 2–1 friendly win over Slovene football club NK Gorica.

On 25 February 2007 he played his first Serie A match for Udinese against Parma. On 1 July 2008, he was sold to Turkish side Beşiktaş for €4.5 million, re-joining Tomáš Sivok. He signed a 3+1-year contract worth €750,000 per season.

On 17 September 2013, Zápotočný joined Czech First League side FK Příbram, signing a three-year contract.

International career
Zápotočný played three times for his county's under-21 team. He currently has four caps for the senior Czech Republic side.

Honours 
 Slovan Liberec
Czech First League (1): 2005–06
 Beşiktaş
Süper Lig (1): 2008–09
 Bursaspor
Süper Lig (1): 2009–10

Footnotes

References
 
 
 Tomáš Zápotočný at Soccerway

1980 births
Living people
Sportspeople from Příbram
Czech footballers
Czech Republic under-21 international footballers
Czech Republic international footballers
Czech First League players
1. FK Příbram players
FK Drnovice players
FC Slovan Liberec players
AC Sparta Prague players
Serie A players
Udinese Calcio players
Expatriate footballers in Italy
Süper Lig players
Beşiktaş J.K. footballers
Bursaspor footballers
Expatriate footballers in Turkey
Czech expatriate footballers
Czech expatriate sportspeople in Turkey
Czech expatriate sportspeople in Italy
FC Baník Ostrava players
Association football defenders
1. FK Příbram managers
Czech football managers
Czech National Football League players
Czech National Football League managers
SK Dynamo České Budějovice managers